Nina Kamenova Dobreva (born January 9, 1989), credited professionally as Nina Dobrev, is a Canadian actress. She is best known for portraying Elena Gilbert and Katherine Pierce on The CW's supernatural drama series The Vampire Diaries (2009–2015).

Born in Sofia and raised in Toronto, Dobrev made her screen debut playing minor roles in various films, before landing her breakout role as Mia Jones in the drama series Degrassi: The Next Generation (2006–2009). She later rose to prominence with her role in The Vampire Diaries, and appeared in several feature films, including the 2012 coming-of-age drama The Perks of Being a Wallflower, the comedies Let's Be Cops and The Final Girls (2014), and the 2017 science-fiction drama Flatliners. Her biggest commercial success came with XXX: Return of Xander Cage (2017). She also starred in the romantic comedies Dog Days (2018), Then Came You (2018) and Love Hard (2021), and had a leading role in the sitcom Fam (2019).

Early life
Nina Kamenova Dobreva was born on January 9, 1989, in Sofia, Bulgaria, to Kamen Dobrev, a computer specialist, and Michaela Dobreva (née Radeva), an artist. She has an older brother. When she was two, her family relocated to Canada, where she was raised in Scarborough, Toronto. At age 10, she moved back to Bulgaria with her mother for two years.

Dobrev attended Vradenburg Junior Public School and J. B. Tyrrell Sr. Public School, where she started ballet and jazz classes and competed in rhythmic gymnastics. She took acting classes at Armstrong Acting Studios in Toronto. Dobrev subsequently attended the arts program at Wexford Collegiate School for the Arts in Scarborough until her graduating year.

Dobrev entered post-secondary studies at Ryerson University (now Toronto Metropolitan University) in Toronto, majoring in sociology, though her pursuit of an acting career prevented her from graduating.

Career

Dobrev's first major acting role was as Mia on the teen drama television series Degrassi: The Next Generation, a role she played for three seasons starting in 2006. She appeared in several feature films in the mid-2000s, including Fugitive Pieces (2007) and Away from Her (2007). Dobrev also headlined a number of television films, including Sci Fi Channel's Never Cry Werewolf (2008), MTV's The American Mall (2008), and two Lifetime original movies.

Dobrev left Degrassi in 2009 to star in The CW's supernatural drama series The Vampire Diaries, a television adaptation of the book series of the same name, playing the lead role of Elena Gilbert. Dobrev recurrently played a 500-year-old doppelgänger vampire named Katherine Pierce. She played the Petrova doppelgänger progenitor Amara, also known as the world's first immortal, in season 5. She crossed over to The Vampire Diaries spinoff The Originals, as doppelgänger character Tatia, in an episode in 2014. In April 2015, Dobrev announced via Instagram that she would be leaving The Vampire Diaries after portraying Elena for six seasons. In January 2017, it was announced that Dobrev would return as Elena and Katherine in The Vampire Diaries series finale.

Dobrev had a minor role in Atom Egoyan's erotic thriller Chloe, theatrically released by Sony Pictures Classics on March 26, 2010. Dobrev also had a small role in the 2011 film The Roommate.

In April 2011, Dobrev was cast as Candace Kelmeckis in the film adaptation of The Perks of Being a Wallflower. In August 2014, she starred in the 20th Century Fox comedy Let's Be Cops.

Dobrev played the role of Vicki Summers in the 2015 horror comedy film The Final Girls. In September 2015, she was cast in the film Arrivals as flight attendant Izzy; the film was later retitled Departures and was scheduled to go into production in April 2017. That year, she was also cast in the romantic comedy Crash Pad, which began filming in Vancouver in fall 2015.

In 2017, Dobrev co-starred as weapons specialist Becky Clearidge in the action film sequel XXX: Return of Xander Cage. It grossed $346 million worldwide, becoming Dobrev's most successful film. The same year, she co-starred as Marlo in the remake of Flatliners.

In March 2018, Dobrev was cast as Clem in the comedy Fam, a CBS sitcom pilot that was picked up to series in May 2018. It premiered January 10, 2019. It was canceled on May 10, 2019 after one season. Dobrev starred as Chloe in the Roger Avary thriller Lucky Day, released 2019. She also joined the cast of the film Run This Town, which was released in March 2020. In July 2020, it was announced that Dobrev would star in and serve as an executive producer for a television adaptation of the Woman 99 book series.

Activism and charity 
Dobrev supports multiple charitable causes, including Puma's 2011 non-profit Project Pink, which supports numerous breast cancer charities, and Hunger Bites, an organization that is dedicated to reducing hunger in 27 districts across Pennsylvania. She is also recognized for her long-term involvement with the WE movement, a Canadian-based charity that empowers youth as agents of change. She took part in a Me to We volunteer trip to Kenya to help build a school. She hosted the We Day event in Toronto in 2011 and made an appearance on stage at WE Day California 2019. Other social and charity issues with which she has been involved include the Elton John AIDS Foundation.

Personal life
Dobrev is a dual citizen of Bulgaria and Canada. She speaks fluent English and Bulgarian, and is conversant in French. While filming The Vampire Diaries, she lived in Atlanta but moved to Los Angeles after leaving the series in 2015.

Filmography

Film

Television

Music videos

Awards and nominations

References

External links

1989 births
21st-century Canadian actresses
Actresses from Sofia
Actresses from Toronto
Bulgarian emigrants to Canada
Canadian child actresses
Canadian expatriate actresses in the United States
Canadian film actresses
Canadian television actresses
Living people
Naturalized citizens of Canada
Toronto Metropolitan University alumni
Canadian people of Bulgarian descent